The Jive Five are an American doo-wop group. They are best known for their debut hit single, "My True Story"  (1961), the Nickelodeon bumper jingles in the 1980s and 1990s, and the fact that they outlasted most of their  musical peers by re-modeling themselves as a soul group in the 1970s and beyond.

Career
The group formed in Brooklyn, New York, in 1954 as "The Genies", with Eugene Pitt, Jerome Hanna, Richard Harris, Thurmon Prophet (also known as Billy Prophet), and Norman Johnson. The group, by then renamed "The Jive Five", found chart success in 1961 with "My True Story" on Beltone Records, which reached No. 3 on the Billboard Hot 100 and topped the Hot R&B Singles chart for three weeks.

The group reorganized following the death of Hanna in 1962, with Pitt, Johnson, Hanna's replacement Andre Coles, Casey Spencer, and Beatrice Best. They recorded "What Time is It", "Never, Never", and "These Golden Rings" for Beltone, before switching to United Artists Records, where they had a hit with "I'm a Happy Man". In 1970 the group moved to Decca Records and recorded as "The Jyve Fyve", with Pitt, Spencer, Richard Fisher, and Richard Harris's brother Webster. They had a minor hit with this name, "I Want You to Be My Baby", on Decca. They also recorded briefly for Avco Records.

The group was constantly active on the oldies circuit. In 1983 Eugene hired his brothers, Frank and Herbert Pitt, and in 1985 Casey Spenser rejoined the touring act. They performed along with Beatrice Best. In the 90s Maurice Unthank performed as keyboard player.

In 1984, Eugene and The Jive Five were introduced to New York cable TV branding consultants Fred Seibert and Alan Goodman (and their company Fred/Alan, Inc.) by their latest producer, Ambient Sound's Marty Pekar. Together with Fred/Alan producer Tom Pomposello they embarked on an almost ten-year relationship, creating and singing the a cappella signature sound of the American kids' television network Nickelodeon, one of the first popular "network" specialized cable television channels. They used the group to write and record some of the most memorable advertising jingles, including the 13-note "Nick-Nick-Nick" motif the network continues to use to this day. They were part of the popular "Kid's Choice" awards, and later, they worked on ID's for HBO Family in 2012.

The group performed on the PBS special Doo Wop 50. The line-up was Pitt, Spencer, Richard Harris, Best, and a fifth member.
Between 2000 and 2006 the line up was led by Pitt on lead vocals, Bea Best, Art Loria (formerly of The Belmonts and Earls), Danny Loria and Harold Gilly. Maurice Unthank took over as band leader.  The group released a single in 2016 entitled "It's Christmas", written by Pitt and the Lorias. It was credited to 'Eugene Pitt and the Jive Five' and featured Pitt, Best, Gill, Unthank, and the Loria's. Dan Loria also took on booking duties and management for the group. Other recordings this line-up recorded included: "Jive Five Sing Along", "Pretend", "I Am Yours", "Falling Tears (remake) "Today", "Close Your Eyes", "You", "Daddy's Home" and many other single releases. Alpine Entertainment announced that a future CD would consolidate these singles into one Jive Five release. 

Eugene Pitt, as one of the founding members with Artie and Danny Loria, was active performing and recording with The Doo Wop All Stars between  1990 and 2006. The group recorded a tribute song to the September 11 attacks victims and heroes, named "We Will Never Fall". It was a Jive Five release in 2001 that was credited to the group "Voices for America".

In June 2010, the group consisted of the then 72-year-old Eugene Pitt, first tenor Frank Pitt, second tenor Casey Spencer, baritone Beatrice Best, and bass Herbert Pitt.

Deaths
Norman Johnson died in 1970. Webster Harris died in 2003. Maurice Unthank died on July 21, 2008. Artie Loria died on October 23, 2010. Beatrice "Bea" Best died on September 15, 2014. He was 81. Founder member Eugene Pitt (born on November 6, 1937) died on June 29, 2018 at the age of 80.

Singles

References

External links
Jive Five Discography
Rock & Roll Library page on The Jive Five
Doo Wop group page including The Jive Five
The Jive Five on All Doo Wop
The Doo-Wopping of Television 1984-1992
Groups on the Doo Wop Shop

An interview with Eugene Pitt in 2009 at Soul Express

American rhythm and blues musical groups
Doo-wop groups
Musical groups established in 1954
Musical quintets
Musical groups from Brooklyn